Freeport Township is one of the fifteen townships of Harrison County, Ohio, United States. As of the 2010 census the population was 745, of whom 376 lived in the unincorporated portion of the township.

Geography
Located in the southwestern corner of the county, it borders the following townships:
Washington Township - north
Moorefield Township - east
Flushing Township, Belmont County - southeast
Londonderry Township, Guernsey County - south
Washington Township, Guernsey County - southwest
Perry Township, Tuscarawas County - northwest

It is the only township in the county to border Guernsey County.

The village of Freeport is located in central Freeport Township. The unincorporated community of Smyrna is located in southeast Freeport Township next to the southern boundary of the township and county.

Name and history
It is the only Freeport Township statewide.

Government
The township is governed by a three-member board of trustees, who are elected in November of odd-numbered years to a four-year term beginning on the following January 1. Two are elected in the year after the presidential election and one is elected in the year before it. There is also an elected township fiscal officer, who serves a four-year term beginning on April 1 of the year after the election, which is held in November of the year before the presidential election. Vacancies in the fiscal officership or on the board of trustees are filled by the remaining trustees.

References

External links
County website

Townships in Harrison County, Ohio
Townships in Ohio